Darryl Lenox is an American comedian who appeared on Conan O'Brien, Comedy Central, WTF with Marc Maron, Starz (TV channel), BET, and A&E (TV channel). He lives in Vancouver, B.C., where he founded the entertainment company Ellison Rains. His stand-up special, Blind Ambition was filmed at The Vogue Theater in Vancouver, BC, and aired on Starz network. Lenox is signed to Stand Up! Records.Before his debut on Starz, Darryl has been seen on A&E’s “Evening at the Improv,” BET’s “Comic View,” “Best of BET’s Comic View Special,” “Best of Just for Laugh’s Comedy Festival New Year’s Eve Special,” Comedy Central’s “Jamie Foxx’s Laffa Polooza,” and Comedy Central’s “Live at Gotham.” He has performed at numerous comedy festivals including Montreal’s JFL, HBO Comedy Arts Festival, Boston Comedy Festival, Chicago Festival, and Vancouver Comedy Festival, and has received such notable titles as Winner of Seattle Comedy Competition and Winner of Best New Play at Vancouver Fringe Festival.

Lenox grew up in Las Vegas and lived in Seattle, Los Angeles, New York, and Vancouver, Canada. He has toured the US and Canada for over 20 years, headlining comedy clubs. He is currently the founder and CEO of Ellison Rains, LLC.

For over 25 years, Lenox has experienced degenerative sight loss, rendering him legally blind. Much of his material focuses on his personal experience surrounding his relationship with his diminishing eyesight and the associated observations and challenges.

Early life
Lenox was born and raised in Las Vegas, Nevada. One of his earliest memories was when he went to Seattle, Washington in search of his father and soon after decided to move there, where he remained until 1993. Then he moved to Los Angeles,  Surrey, British Columbia, and later moved to New York and later Vancouver, B.C.

Early career
Lenox said, “You know you are doing something right when you can cry about it.” Most of the comedian's early career in stand-up was performed in Canada. In 2005, following the Just for Laughs festival in Montreal, Lenox traveled to Florida intending to return. With no work permit, he was denied access by the border patrol and excluded from the country for a year, leaving all of his belongings in his Canadian apartment.

Stand-up success
Lenox has been performing in comedy clubs throughout the United States and Canada since the early 1990s. Some of his career accomplishments include opening for Chuck Berry and Maxi Priest, being the Winner of Best New Play at Vancouver Fringe Festival, and being the Winner of the Seattle Comedy Competition.

He has appeared on BET's ComicView, Comedy Central's Jamie Foxx's Laffa Polooza, and Live at Gotham.

Lenox's comedy special "Blind Ambition" appeared on Starz in November 2012 and continues to be featured on their channel multiple times a month. After his success on Starz, Lenox caught the eye of late-night television and was featured on Conan O'Brien on February 7, 2013.

In addition to touring comedy clubs, Lenox has been featured on Sirius XM's Raw Dog Comedy, and Marc Maron's WTF Podcast.

Humanitarian
Having been afflicted with deteriorating eyesight since his youth, Lenox shrugs off any notion of self-pity. “I can’t see two feet in front of me, but I can see tomorrow.”  Surgery restored some of his vision and delayed the inevitable. Lenox partnered with the Third World Eye Care Society (TWECS), which has helped to offer treatment solutions to the visually impaired in third-world countries around the world. The mission of TWECS is to provide eye exams and eyeglasses to those in need. Lenox believes that poverty should never prevent one from enjoying a better quality of life through a better vision.

Highlights
A&E's Evening at the Improv
BET's Comic View
Best of BET's Comic View Special
Best of Just For Laughs Comedy Festival New Year's Eve Special
Comedy Central Jamie Foxx's Laffa Polooza
Comedy Central Live at Gotham
Conan O'Brien Featured Comedian
Marc Maron WTF Podcast Featured Comedian
Montreal JFL Special
HBO Comedy Arts Festival
Boston Comedy Festival
Chicago Comedy Festival
Vancouver Comedy Festival
Winner of the Seattle Comedy Competition
Winner of Best New Play at Vancouver Fringe Festival

References

External links
 
 

1960s births
Year of birth uncertain
Living people
American stand-up comedians
People from Las Vegas
21st-century American comedians
Stand Up! Records artists